Moseley Park is an  private park in Moseley, Birmingham, maintained by Moseley Trust.  It is located to the west of the district centre and the A435 Alcester Road.

History
The park and pool were originally part of the gardens of Moseley Hall, which were designed by the estate landscape gardener Humphry Repton. Towards the end of the 19th century most of the estate was being sold for house building; in particular, the construction of Salisbury Road in 1896 disconnected the park from the Hall.

Businessmen bought the park and pool in order to prevent further development and preserve them for the citizens of Birmingham. The park was opened by local East Worcestershire MP Austen Chamberlain on 29 September 1899.

In 1983, the park became part of the wider Moseley Conservation area. This seeks to preserve the historic character of the locality. In particular, the centre of the park contains a number of specimen trees.

Amenities and events

The park has a tennis and yoga club, and hosts annual music festivals, including the Moseley Folk & Arts Festival, and Mostly Jazz. Ocean Colour Scene, who originate from the area, headlined a festival at the park in 2016 to celebrate the 20th anniversary of their album Moseley Shoals.

An ice house in the park is Grade II listed. The ice house was used for cold storage and storing ice before the invention of the refrigerator. It is believed to have storage space for up to 20 tonnes of ice and food materials were placed above it to be used as frozen food. It is now open for public viewing.    

In 2015, the Sunday Times named the park as one of the desirable factors for Moseley being the best place to live in the UK, beating London’s Mayfair and Muswell Hill.

Security
A key is required to gain entry. Residents with keys have a say in the management, while the public may purchase a day key with a refundable deposit. The head ranger has said it has made the park popular as people feel safe inside it. An incident where a man was spotted armed with a knife in the park surprised the head ranger, who said that she had not heard of such a case in her 15 years of managing the site.

See also
 Cannon Hill Park

References

External links

 

Parks and open spaces in Birmingham, West Midlands
Moseley